Pistha may refer to:
 Pistha (1997 film), an Indian Tamil-language comedy film
 Thoranai, or Pistha, a 2009 Indian action drama film
 Pistha (2022 film), an Indian Tamil-language drama film